The Sturgis Journal is a daily newspaper published in Sturgis, Michigan, United States. It is owned by Gannett. Previous owner GateHouse Media acquired the paper from Independent Media Group in 2000.

The Journal covers Sturgis and other St. Joseph County communities such as Burr Oak, Centreville, Colon, Constantine, Mendon, Three Rivers and White Pigeon.

The newspaper bills itself as the oldest business in the city of Sturgis. It began as a weekly newspaper, The Sturgis Journal, on July 4, 1859, later known as the Sturgis Journal-Times. It switched to daily publication under the name Sturgis Daily Journal in 1916. The words "the" and "daily" were dropped in 1946.

References

External links 
 

Gannett publications
Newspapers published in Michigan
St. Joseph County, Michigan
Newspapers established in 1859
1859 establishments in Michigan